Jeffrey Keller Espich (born November 8, 1942) is an American former politician from the state of Indiana. A Republican, he served in the Indiana House of Representatives from 1972 to 2012. He previously served in the United States Army from 1965 to 1967. Espich served as was Speaker Pro Tempore of the Indiana House of Representatives from 1985 to 1990. In 2012, Mike Pence chose Espich to be Senior Advisor for Legislative Affairs for his administration.

References

External links

|-

|-

Living people
1942 births
Members of the Indiana House of Representatives